James Wainwright (March 5, 1938 – December 20, 1999) was an American actor best known for his roles in films such as Joe Kidd (1972), The President's Plane Is Missing (1973), Killdozer (1974), Bridger (1976, as Jim Bridger), The Private Files of J. Edgar Hoover (1977), Mean Dog Blues (1978), Battletruck (1982) and The Survivors (1983).

His television appearances include Beyond Westworld and Jigsaw.

Filmography

References

External links
 

1938 births
1999 deaths
American male television actors
American male film actors
20th-century American male actors
Male Western (genre) film actors